The torso is the central part of the body.

Torso may also refer to:
 Torsö, an island in Sweden
 Torsö (crater), a crater on the planet Mars
 Torso (Image Comics), a graphic novel by Brian Michael Bendis
 Torso (1973 film), an Italian thriller by Sergio Martino
 Torso (1983 film), a Swedish ballet documentary choreographed by Jiří Kylián